Bridge in Portage Township is a historic stone arch bridge located at Portage Township in Cambria County, Pennsylvania. It was built by the Allegheny Portage Railroad in 1832, and is an  bridge, with a semi-circular arch. It is built of coursed ashlar and crosses Bens Creek.

It was listed on the National Register of Historic Places in 1988.

See also
List of bridges documented by the Historic American Engineering Record in Pennsylvania

References

External links

Railroad bridges on the National Register of Historic Places in Pennsylvania
Bridges completed in 1832
Bridges in Cambria County, Pennsylvania
Historic American Engineering Record in Pennsylvania
National Register of Historic Places in Cambria County, Pennsylvania
Stone arch bridges in the United States